The RZA Presents: Afro Samurai The Soundtrack is the film score album by American rapper and producer RZA. It was released on January 30, 2007 via Koch Records, as the soundtrack to animated television series Afro Samurai. Production was primarily handled by RZA, with Stone Mecca, J-Love and M1. It features contributions from Big Daddy Kane, Talib Kweli, Q-Tip and Wu-Tang Clan members and affiliates. 

Featuring the historic collaboration between Big Daddy Kane and GZA – "Cameo Afro", this album received great and positive reviews from many websites and magazines.

On February 1, 2007 RZA was interviewed on the Late Show on CBS and performed the song "Fury in My Eyes/Revenge" featuring Thea Van Seijen.

Track listing
Track listing information is adapted from the liner notes, AllMusic and Discogs.

Notes
 Songs 21–24 are listed as Bobby Digital bonus tracks.
 The album contains various dialogue excerpts from the first season of the Afro Samurai anime.

References

External links

Afro Samurai Soundtrack article

RZA albums
2007 soundtrack albums
Hip hop soundtracks
E1 Music soundtracks
Albums produced by RZA
Wu Music Group soundtracks
Television animation soundtracks